Brutus is a Latin surname, which usually refers to Marcus Junius Brutus (85–42 BC), one of the assassins of the Roman dictator Julius Caesar.

Brutus may also refer to:

People

Romans
 Lucius Junius Brutus, putative founder of the Roman Republic
 Marcus Junius Brutus, Julius Caesar's most famous assassin, usually the one referred to in literature and art
 Decimus Junius Brutus Albinus, another of Caesar's assassins
 Junius Brutus (disambiguation), others with similar names

Other people
 Brutus of Troy, legendary founder of Britain
 Brutus Greenshield, Brutus II
 Brutus (Antifederalist), author of several Anti-Federalist Papers
 Brutus Babington, 1558–1611, Irish bishop
 Brutus Beefcake, stage name of professional wrestler Edward Leslie
 Brutus (rapper), Dutch rapper
 Junius Brutus, pseudonym of Charles Blount (deist) (1654–1693)
 Brutus, pseudonym of Lucien Bonaparte during the French Revolution
 Roman Czerniawski or Brutus (1910–1985), World War II double agent

Fictional
 Bluto or Brutus, a cartoon character from "Popeye"
 Brutus, a character in Anima: Age of the Robots
 Brutus, a character in Human Killing Machine
 Brutus, a character in The Hunger Games
 Brutus, a character in The Rescuers
 Brutus, a character in Race for Your Life, Charlie Brown
Brutus, an unlockable character in the Chapter 2, Season 2 Battle Pass in Fortnite Battle Royale

Places
 Brutus, Łódź Voivodeship, in central Poland
 Brutus, Michigan, unincorporated community in Emmet County, Michigan, United States
 Brutus, New York, a town in Cayuga County, New York, United States

Music
 Brutus (Canadian band), a 1970s Canadian band
 Brutus (Czech band), a Czech rock band
 Brutus (Norwegian band), a Norwegian  blues rock band
 Brutus (Belgian band), a Belgian post-hardcore rock band
 Brutus (album)

Transportation
 Texan schooner Brutus, a ship in the Texas Navy
 Brutus, a South Devon Railway Dido-class steam locomotives

Other uses
 Brutus (Cicero), an oratory by Cicero
 Brutus (magazine), a Japanese magazine
 Brutus (sculpture), a sculpture by Michelangelo
 Brutus (tragedy), a play by Voltaire
 Brutus (1911 film), an Italian film
 Brutus (2016 film)
 Brutus, or The Lictors Bring to Brutus the Bodies of His Sons, a painting by Jacques-Louis David
 Brutus, a character in Shakespeare's Julius Caesar
 Brutus, or The Fall of Tarquin, a play by John Howard Payne

People with the surname
 Dennis Brutus (1924–2009), South African poet
 Joel Brutus (born 1974), Haitian judoka

See also
 Brutus Buckeye, the athletics mascot of Ohio State University
 Brutus cluster, a high-performance cluster at ETH Zurich
 Brutus Jeans, maker of denim apparel in the 1970s and '80s